John McNairy (March 30, 1762 – November 12, 1837) was a British-American federal judge of the United States District Court for the District of Tennessee, the United States District Court for the Eastern District of Tennessee and the United States District Court for the Western District of Tennessee.

Education and career

Born on March 30, 1762, in Lancaster County, Province of Pennsylvania, British America, McNairy read law in 1788. He entered private practice in Jonesboro, North Carolina (unorganized territory from April 2, 1790, Southwest Territory from May 26, 1790) starting in 1788. He was a Judge of the Superior Court of Law and Equity, Mero District, starting in 1788. He was nominated to the Territorial Court for the Southwest Territory by President Washington on June 7, 1790, and was confirmed by the United States Senate on June 8, 1790, serving in that post until his appointment to the District of Tennessee.

Federal judicial service

He was confirmed by the United States Senate on February 20, 1797, and received his commission the same day. His service terminated on September 1, 1833, due to his resignation.

The Judiciary Act of 1801 abolished the United States District Court for the District of Tennessee on February 13, 1801, and assigned McNairy to serve as a district judge on the United States Circuit Court for the Sixth Circuit. The Act was repealed on March 8, 1802, reestablishing the district court as of July 1, 1802.

Death

McNairy died on November 12, 1837, near Nashville, Tennessee.

Honor

McNairy County, Tennessee, is named in McNairy's honor.

Note

References

Sources
 

1762 births
1837 deaths
People from Lancaster County, Pennsylvania
Judges of the United States District Court for the District of Tennessee
Judges of the United States District Court for the Eastern District of Tennessee
Judges of the United States District Court for the Western District of Tennessee
United States federal judges appointed by George Washington
18th-century American judges
Tennessee state court judges
United States federal judges admitted to the practice of law by reading law
19th-century American judges